Wade Miller (born June 10, 1973) is the current President and Chief Executive Officer of the Canadian Football League's Winnipeg Blue Bombers and a former professional Canadian football player.

Football career
After four seasons with the Manitoba Bisons, Miller was drafted by the Blue Bombers in the fourth round (37th overall) in the 1995 CFL Draft. He played 11 seasons in the CFL, all with the Blue Bombers, appearing in 159 regular season games and eight playoff games. Drafted as a linebacker, Miller moved to fullback because of his small stature and was a fixture on the Blue Bombers special teams. He was twice named to the CFL East Division All-Star team (1997, 1999) and is third all-time in special teams tackles with 184, behind Mike Miller and Jason Arakgi.

Miller retired from football after the 2005 season. He was inducted into the Blue Bombers Hall of Fame in 2011.

Post-football career
Away from football, Miller has worked as an employment recruiter and motivational speaker. In 2002, he co-founded Pinnacle Staffing, an employment agency which specializes in executive and management recruitment.  He is also involved in numerous other business ventures, including multiple Booster Juice franchises, and is an active member of the Blue Bombers Alumni Association.  The Globe and Mail named Miller as one of Canada's Top 40 under-40 in 2007.

The Winnipeg Football Club appointed Miller as acting CEO in August 2013, following the resignation of Garth Buchko.  Two months later, the Blue Bombers confirmed Miller as their new President and CEO.

Personal
Miller was born and raised in Winnipeg, Manitoba.  His father, Allen, played linebacker for the Blue Bombers during the 1960s after a short stint with the Washington Redskins in the National Football League. His brother, Ritchie, works as an umpire for the CFL.

References

External links
Winnipeg Blue Bombers Profile 
Just Sports Stats

1973 births
Living people
Canadian football people from Winnipeg
Winnipeg Blue Bombers players
Canadian football fullbacks
Manitoba Bisons football players
Players of Canadian football from Manitoba
Valour FC non-playing staff